Geay may refer to the following places in France:

 Geay, Charente-Maritime, a commune in the Charente-Maritime department
 Geay, Deux-Sèvres, a commune in the Deux-Sèvres department